The 1984 Arab Club Champions Cup was the second edition of the Arab Club Champions Cup, and was held in the city of Dammam, Saudi Arabia - the home city of eventual winners Al-Ettifaq.

Participants

Fixtures and results

Winner

References

External links
2nd Arab Club Champions Cup 1984 - rsssf.com

1984
1984 in Asian football
1984 in African football
International club association football competitions hosted by Saudi Arabia
1984–85 in Bahraini football
1984–85 in Saudi Arabian football